The 2011 Toray Pan Pacific Open was a women's tennis tournament played on outdoor hard courts. It was the 28th edition of the Toray Pan Pacific Open, and was part of the Premier Series of the 2011 WTA Tour. It took place at the Ariake Coliseum in Tokyo, Japan, from September 26 through October 2, 2011. Agnieszka Radwańska won the singles title.

Champions

Singles

 Agnieszka Radwańska defeated  Vera Zvonareva, 6–3, 6–2.
It was Radwańska's second title of the year and sixth overall.

Doubles

 Liezel Huber /  Lisa Raymond defeated  Gisela Dulko /  Flavia Pennetta, 7–6(7–4), 0–6, [10–6].

Points and prize money

Entrants

Seeds

 Rankings are as of September 19, 2011.

Other entrants
The following players received wildcards into the singles main draw:
  Misaki Doi
  Kristýna Plíšková
  Laura Robson

The following players received entry from the qualifying draw:

  Jill Craybas
  Angelique Kerber
  Mandy Minella
  Karolína Plíšková
  Urszula Radwańska
  Anastasia Rodionova
  Erika Sema
  Coco Vandeweghe

Notable withdrawals
  Kim Clijsters
  Li Na
  Andrea Petkovic
  Sabine Lisicki
  Francesca Schiavone
  Roberta Vinci
  Yanina Wickmayer
  Serena Williams
  Venus Williams

References

External links

Official website

Toray Pan Pacific Open
Pan Pacific Open
2011 in Japanese women's sport
Toray Pan Pacific Open
Toray Pan Pacific Open
Toray Pan Pacific Open